Hatherly is a surname. Notable people with the surname include:

Alan Hatherly (born 1996), South African mountain bike racer
Ana Hatherly (1929–2015), Portuguese academic, poet, visual artist, and writer

See also
Hatherley (disambiguation)